Krabathor, also spelled Krabator on their early demos, is a Czech death metal band from Uherské Hradiště, founded by vocalist and guitarist Petr "Christopher" Kryštof in 1984. The band also includes bassist/vocalist Bronislav "Bruno" Kovařík and drummer Peter "Pegas" Hlaváč.

History
Krabathor, whose name is inspired by Krabat, the main character in the Sorbian fairy tale The Satanic Mill, was formed in 1984. In 1988, they released their first rehearsal demo, Breath of Death, which was soon followed by two more, Total Destruction and Brutal Death, all under the name Krabator. In 1991, the studio demo Pocity detronizace was recorded, resulting in a deal for two albums with Monitor Records. The band's first studio album was released in 1992, under the title Only Our Death Is Welcome..., and was followed by Cool Mortification a year later. A record deal followed with Morbid Records, and the album Lies came out in 1995, supported by the band's first European tour, with Impaled Nazarene. In 1996, they played at the No Mercy Festival.

In March 1998, Krabathor issued the album Orthodox, and they toured extensively through Europe with Cannibal Corpse. A year later, they toured with Malevolent Creation and Master. At that point, Bruno left the band to form Hypnos and was replaced by Paul Speckmann, of Master. They issued two albums in this lineup: Unfortunately Dead (2000)
and Dissuade Truth (2003). , these are Krabathor's last original releases.

In 2003, the band, after playing their last concert at the inaugural Basinfirefest in Spálené Poříčí, went on an indefinite hiatus. Kryštof moved to the United States, Speckmann returned to Master, and then-drummer Libor Lebánek formed the band Bad Face with his brother.

In 2014, Krabathor reunited for an exclusive show at the Brutal Assault festival in Jaroměř, in their classic lineup of Kryštof, Kovařík, and Hlaváč. In 2015, they launched the Krabatour, performing several concerts across Czechia and Slovakia.

In 2021, the band released Demonizer / Mortal Memories II, a compilation of their 1988 demos Breath of Death, Total Destruction, and Brutal Death.

Band members
Current
 Petr "Christopher" Kryštof – guitars, vocals (1984–2006, 2013–present)
 Bronislav "Bruno" Kovařík – bass, vocals (1986–1987, 1991–1998, 2013–present); drums (1988–1990)
 Peter "Pegas" Hlaváč – drums (1993–1996, 2013–present)

Past
 Roman "Myšák" Podškubka – bass (1984–1986, 1988)
 Luděk "Havran" Havránek – drums (1984–1987, 1987–1988, 1989)
 Radek "Bája" Kutil – guitar (1988–1990)
 Jiří "Necron" Novák – bass (1988–1990)
 Petr "Kopec" Kopeček – drums (1990–1993)
 Martin "Trachta" Mikulec – guitar (1990, 1993)
 René "Hire" Hílek – guitar (1991–1992)
 Libor "Skull" Lebánek – drums (1996–2004)
 Paul Speckmann – bass, vocals (1999–2005)

Session musicians
 M. Štědroň – keyboards on Pocity detronizace and Feelings of Dethronisation
 Petr Ackermann – keyboards on Only Our Death Is Welcome... and Cool Mortification
 Tomáš Kmeť – keyboards on Lies and Orthodox
 Irena Černíčková – keyboards on Unfortunately Dead

Timeline

Discography

 Breath of Death (demo, 1988)
 Total Destruction (demo, 1988)
 Brutal Death (demo, 1988)
 Pocity detronizace (demo, 1991)
 Feelings of Dethronisation (demo, 1991)
 Only Our Death Is Welcome... (1992)
 Cool Mortification (1993)
 The Rise of Brutality (EP, 1995)
 Lies (1995)
 Mortal Memories (EP, 1997)
 Orthodox (1998)
 First Alben (2-CD re-release of Only Our Death Is Welcome... and Cool Mortification, 1999)
 Unfortunately Dead (2000)
 Dissuade Truth (2003)
 20 Years of Madness (2-CD demo collection, 2005)
 Rebirth of Brutality: Live in Uherské Hradiště (CD + 2 DVDs, 2015)
 Dema 1988 (compilation of 1988 demos, 2021)
 Demonizer / Mortal Memories II (compilation of Breath of Death, Total Destruction, and Brutal Death, 2021)

References

External links
 Krabathor on Bandzone.cz
 Krabathor history (scan from Metal Hammer, 1995)

Czech death metal musical groups
Musical groups established in 1984
People from Uherské Hradiště
Uherské Hradiště
Musical trios